Dogs for Defense was a World War II US military program in which the military asked pet owners to donate their pet dogs to the war effort.  The dogs were trained and used for guard and patrol duties.  To encourage donations, the dogs were deprogrammed and returned after the war.

History

Prior to World War II, the US military did not have a formal K-9 corp and owned fewer than a hundred dogs (mostly sled dogs in Alaska). After Pearl Harbor, a woman named Alene Erlanger pushed for the US military to begin using dogs.

References

Additional references
 
 
 
 

Military animals of World War II